This article contains the results of the 2020 Green Party presidential primaries and caucuses, the processes by which the Green Party of the United States selects delegates to attend the 2020 Green National Convention.

Results and calendar

Results by state

Minnesota caucus
The Green Party of Minnesota held its caucus (a non-binding straw poll which has no impact on choosing delegates) on February 25, 2020. Dario Hunter won the caucuses with 81.25% of the vote, however the delegates apportioned will be determined at the state convention in June.

The caucus used ranked-choice voting. However, Hunter won in the first round.

Ohio caucus

California primary

Massachusetts primary

North Carolina primary

Missouri primary

Illinois primary

Colorado primary

Texas primary
The Green Party of Texas held a sequential proportional approval voting primary.

Virginia primary
The Green Party of Virginia held a ranked choice primary.

Pennsylvania caucus

New Jersey primary

South Carolina convention

New York primary

West Virginia primary

Hawaii primary

Maryland primary

Results by caucus

Young Ecosocialists

See also
 2020 Green National Convention
 2020 Green Party presidential primaries
 2020 United States presidential election

Notes

References

2020 Green Party of the United States presidential primaries